Luigi Tasselli (20 October 1901 – 5 November 1971) was an Italian cyclist. He won the gold medal in the Men's team pursuit in the 1928 Summer Olympics along with Giacomo Gaioni, Mario Lusiani, and Cesare Facciani.

References

1901 births
1971 deaths
Cyclists at the 1928 Summer Olympics
Olympic cyclists of Italy
Olympic gold medalists for Italy
Italian male cyclists
Olympic medalists in cycling
Cyclists from the Province of Mantua
Medalists at the 1928 Summer Olympics
Italian track cyclists